Michael Chu may refer to:
Michael Chu (private equity investor), American private equity manager
Michael Chu (poker player), American poker player